Sharjah National Park is a park in Sharjah, the United Arab Emirates. The park is the largest in Sharjah, covering approximately 630,000 m2.

See also 
 Jebel Hafeet National Park, Abu Dhabi
 Mangrove National Park, Abu Dhabi
 Shees Park Sharjah

References 

Protected areas established in 1982
National parks of the United Arab Emirates
Geography of the Emirate of Sharjah
Tourist attractions in the Emirate of Sharjah
1982 establishments in the United Arab Emirates